Nduduzo Peabo Lembethe (born 13 January 1996) is a South African field hockey player. He competed in the 2020 Summer Olympics.

References

External links

1996 births
Living people
Sportspeople from Pietermaritzburg
2018 Men's Hockey World Cup players
Field hockey players at the 2020 Summer Olympics
South African male field hockey players
Olympic field hockey players of South Africa
University of Pretoria alumni
Male field hockey midfielders
TuksHockey Club players
Alumni of Maritzburg College
Field hockey players at the 2022 Commonwealth Games
2023 Men's FIH Hockey World Cup players